Air Gaspé was a Canadian airline headquartered in Sept-Îles, Quebec.

The airline began charter flights in 1951 as Trans-Gaspesian Air Lines ans renamed to the current in 1966. In 1973 became a subsidiary of Quebecair but continued with own name until 1986. The airline operated scheduled passenger and cargo flights from Gaspé to other Canadian cities.

Destinations

Bonaventure
Charlo
Gaspé
Havre Saint-Pierre
Îles-de-la-Madeleine
Matane/Russell-Burnett
MontJoli
Port-Menier
Québec City Jean Lesage
Sainte-Anne-des-Monts
Sept-Îles

Fleet
Beech 18
Cessna 180
DHC-2 Beaver
Douglas DC-3
Grumman Widgeon
Hawker Siddeley HS 748
Lockheed 10 Electra
Piper Apache
Piper Navajo

Accidents and incidents
On 29 May 1973, Douglas C-47A CF-QBB crashed on approach to Rimouski Airport, killing all four people on board.

See also 
 List of defunct airlines of Canada

References

  Well archive

Defunct airlines of Canada
Sept-Îles, Quebec